Indy de Vroome (born 21 May 1996) is a Dutch tennis player.

De Vroome has won seven singles and six doubles titles on the ITF Women's Circuit. On 14 July 2014, she reached her best singles ranking of world No. 177. On 1 August 2016, she peaked at No. 218 in the doubles rankings.

Career
De Vroome was awarded a wildcard to compete in the qualifying draw of the 2012 Miami Open, but she lost in the first round to Sloane Stephens.

She made her WTA Tour main-draw debut at the 2012 UNICEF Open.

De Vroome made her debut at a Grand Slam qualifying event in May 2014 at the French Open, defeating former top-30 player Kateryna Bondarenko in straight sets in the first round, but was defeated in round two by third seed Tímea Babos.

At the Diamond Games in February 2015, she achieved her first WTA Tour main-draw match-win by defeating Tsvetana Pironkova in the first round. It was also her first win against a top-50 player.

De Vroome did not play competitive tennis from the summer of 2016 until October 2018 due to Lyme disease. She made a strong come-back in 2019, playing six ITF finals of which she won four. Her ranking improved from nr. 842 in early 2019 to nr. 211 in the first week of December of that year.

Grand Slam singles performance timelines

ITF Circuit finals

Singles: 15 (7 titles, 8 runner–ups)

Doubles: 7 (6 titles, 1 runner–up)

Notes

References

External links

 
 

1996 births
Living people
People from Vught
Dutch female tennis players
21st-century Dutch women